Agostina Mileo (Buenos Aires, 1987) is an Argentine environmentalist, science communicator, and writer. Through her alter ego Scientist Barbie, she analyzes how the gender gap in science affects the production of knowledge. Mileo is the author of the popular science book "Let Science accompany you (to fight for your rights)". She is part of the group Economía Feminista where she leads the MenstruAction campaign that seeks, among other things, to make visible how menstruation is a factor of inequality for women.

Career 

Mileo has a degree in Environmental sciences and a master's degree in Scientific communication. She is currently a doctoral student in History and Epistemology of Science at the National University of Tres de Febrero in Argentina.

She develops her work through her alter ego as the Scientist Barbie. Mileo has been described as "the Argentine that is all the rage among Millennials" for her work in the development of scientific dissemination strategies and her impact on young people. Scientist Barbie was born as a communication resource with the objective of confronting prejudices, gender bias and promoting the desacralization of science. In this sense, Mileo seeks to meet an existing demand from people who are interested in science without having it studied.

Mileo is part of the Economía Feminista collective where she coordinates the MenstruAcción campaign that seeks to end the stigma of the menstrual period, guarantee the free provision of menstrual products and raise awareness of the impact on the fundamental rights of women. Currently, eleven bills have been presented in the framework of the campaign, both at the national level and in different Argentine provinces.

Mileo writes the section Science, knowledge and dissemination of the Cenital newsletter that comes out every Monday, called the same as her book, May science be with you.

She published with Indielibros "Maternal Instinct. Since when is childbirth a destiny?", an essay in which she reviews how throughout history a relationship between Motherhood and being a woman was established and denatures the idea that having and caring for children justifies any sacrifice, without the possibility of questioning it. Mileo made the Noticiencia, thirty short videos of scientific communication with a gender perspective for El Canciller and published The Steps of Aquiles on the scientific culture site of the National University of General Sarmiento.

Awards 
As part of Mileo's work in Economía Feminista, they received the Lola Mora Awards in 2016 for best digital medium awarded, by the General Directorate for Women and promoted by the legislature of the Autonomous City of Buenos Aires.

References

External links 
 La Barbie Scientífica – Instagram
 Menstruacción campaign
 Que la ciencia te acompañe newsletter

Living people
1987 births
Argentine environmentalists